HMS Edgar was a first class cruiser of the Royal Navy, and lead ship of the . She was built at Devonport and launched on 24 November 1890.

Service history

A crew for the river service steamer HMS Robin, built at Hong Kong, was also included. She left Devonport on 3 March, and called at Gibraltar, Malta, Aden, Colombo and Singapore, before she arrived at the station headquarters at Hong Kong later that spring.

In April 1902 her boilers were re-tubed due to defects, and after taking part in the Coronation review in August 1902, she was commissioned to relieve Endymion serving on the China Station.

She was damaged in an attack by the Austro-Hungarian submarine  on 4 April 1918 near position . Edgar was sold on 9 May 1921. She arrived at Morecambe on 24 April 1923 for breaking up.

Notes

References 

 

Edgar-class cruisers
Ships built in Plymouth, Devon
Victorian-era cruisers of the United Kingdom
World War I cruisers of the United Kingdom
1890 ships